The Texas State Bobcats women's basketball team is the basketball team that represents Texas State University. The school's team currently competes in the Sun Belt Conference. Southwest Texas State became Texas State in 2003.

History

The Bobcats have an all-time record (as of the end of the 2015–16 season) of 715–682. They have made the NCAA Tournament twice (1997 and 2003), the WNIT once (2008) and the WBI twice (2014 and 2015).

NCAA tournament results

References

External links
 

 
1966 establishments in Texas
Basketball teams established in 1966